Shivaji College is a constituent college of the University of Delhi. It offers degrees in various subjects at both undergraduate and postgraduate levels.

History 
Shivaji College was established in 1961 in New Delhi by the Hon'ble Dr Panjabrao Deshmukh, The college was established to provide education in what was a largely rural area.

This college infrastructure includes a library, over 78,000 books, and e-journals and e-books through the Delhi University Library System (DULS).

Academics

Academic programmes 
Within the constraints of prescribed syllabi, this college attempts to offer an eclectic selection, a range of options for students.

 B.A. (H): Business Economics, English, History, Hindi, Political Science, Sanskrit, Economics, Geography
 B.A. Programme
 B.Com (H)
 BSc. (H) Mathematics, Botany, Physics, Biochemistry
 M.A. Hindi, Political Science, Sanskrit

Rankings 
It is ranked 51st across India by National Institutional Ranking Framework in 2020.

Notable alumni 

 Mr O.P. Wadhwa, a leading lawyer

 Mr Harbhajan Singh, a leading exporter
 Major Y.S. Gehlot, Army Officer
 Mr Sachin Bhamba, General Secretary of an NGO named SPACE
 Dr Naresh Sood, a cancer surgeon
 Dr Navdeep Chhabra, a renowned urologist

See also 

 St. Stephen's College, Delhi
 Hans Raj College, Delhi
 Shri Ram College of Commerce, Delhi
 Miranda House, University of Delhi, Delhi
 Loyola College, Chennai, University of Madras
 Narsee Monjee College of Commerce and Economics, Mumbai
 St. Xavier's College, Mumbai, University of Mumbai, Mumbai
 Education in India
 List of institutions of higher education in Delhi
 Kirori Mal College
 Lady Shri Ram College

References

External links
 Shivaji College website

Delhi University
Monuments and memorials to Shivaji
1961 establishments in Delhi
Educational institutions established in 1961